CHEV-FM is a community radio station that operates at 94.5 MHz in Grand Falls-Windsor, Newfoundland and Labrador, Canada. The station is branded as Valley Radio.

History
The station originally began as an internet radio station in 2017 as a project to bring local voices back to the Grand Falls-Windsor area, after the CBC<ref>CBC puts central Newfoundland operations under one roof, CBC News, February 27, 2015</ref> and VOCM closed the stations in the community.

On July 29, 2019, Exploits Valley Community Radio Inc. (EVCR) received approval from the Canadian Radio-television and Telecommunications Commission (CRTC) to operate a low-power, English-language community FM radio station at 94.5 MHz in Grand Falls-Windsor, Newfoundland and Labrador.

In November 2020, CHEV-FM signed on the air as Valley Radio''.

Notes
The callsign CHEV was previously used at a radio station in Toronto, Ontario from 1997 to 2011.

References

External links
Valley Radio
 History of CHEV-FM - Canadian Communications Foundation

Hev
Hev